Pinehurst Branch is a tributary stream of the Potomac River in Washington, D.C., United States.

References

Rivers of Washington, D.C.
Tributaries of the Potomac River